Bob and Mike Bryan successfully defended their title, defeating Raven Klaasen and Leander Paes in the final, 6–3, 3–6, [10–6].

Seeds

Draw

Draw

References
 Main Draw

Delray Beach International Tennis Championships - Doubles
2015 Doubles
2015 Delray Beach International Tennis Championships